The N. Webster Chappell House is an historic Queen Anne style home, located at 4131 Yuma Street, Northwest, Washington, D.C., west of Tenley Circle, in the Tenleytown neighborhood.

It was built in 1910, and added to the National Register of Historic Places in 2011.

References

Houses on the National Register of Historic Places in Washington, D.C.